Gianina is a feminine given name. Notable people with the name include:

Gianina Beleaga (born 1995), Romanian rower
Gianina Ernst (born 1998), German ski jumper

See also
Gianna
Giannina Facio (born 1955), Costa Rican actress and film producer

Feminine given names